Raddusa is a comune (municipality) in the Province of Catania in the Italian region of Sicily, located about  southeast of Palermo and about  west of Catania near the lake Ogliastro.  
 
Raddusa borders the following municipalities: Aidone, Assoro, Piazza Armerina, Castel di Judica, Ramacca.

Economy
The main business of the town is based on agriculture, mainly of cereals, therefore, it is named "The City of Grain" and every year in September for three days the citizen gather in the town center to celebrate their traditional Festa del Grano or Grain's Feast to remember the local traditions.

References

External links
 Official website

Cities and towns in Sicily